Adieu Paris is a German-Luxembourgian-French film directed by Franziska Buch. The film is also known as Upgrade.

Plot
Patrizia is a successful author. When she learns her allegedly unmarried boyfriend Jean-Jacques lies in a hospital in Paris because he had a grave car accident, she rushes head over heels to the airport. Unfortunately she forgets her credit card and cannot pay the ticket for Paris. By discussing this she causes a deadlock at the counter. A German business man (Frank) who has to stand line behind her fears he might miss his flight and helps her out with some money. So they get to know each other and get together to Paris, where Frank is supposed to handle an International merger. But both of them are confronted by unexpected twists when they arrive. Patrizia finds a French woman named Françoise at the bedside of her lover. Françoise breaks it to her that Jean-Jacques is her husband. Meanwhile Frank discovers that the merger cannot take place because of unforeseen accountancy issues.

Cast
 Jessica Schwarz as Patrizia
 Sandrine Bonnaire as Françoise Dupret
 Hans Werner Meyer as Frank Berndssen
 Gérard Jugnot as Albert
 Jean-Yves Berteloot as Jean-Jacques Dupret
 Ina Weisse as Gloria Berndssen
 Thure Lindhardt as Mika
 Catherine Hosmalin as Madame Colussant
 Silvia Maleen as analyst

References

External links
 Official Homepage
 
 

2013 films
German drama films
2010s German-language films
Luxembourgian drama films
French drama films
2010s French-language films
Films set in Paris
2013 multilingual films
2010s French films
2010s German films